In July 2017, 63 Dornier 228 were in airline service.  Other operators include police, law enforcement, paramilitary operators and military operators.

Civilian operators

 Aerocardal (3)
 Agni Air (2) leased to Simrik Airlines
 Air Caraïbes (3)
 Air Marshall Islands (2)
 Air West Coast (2)
 Alkan Air   (2)
 Alliance Air (2)
 APSA Colombia (1)
 Arcus Air (2)
 Aurigny (1)
 Bighorn Airways (3)
 Daily Air (4)
 Divi Divi Air (1)
 Dornier Aviation Nigeria (9)
 GAM Aviation (3)
 German Aerospace Center (2)
 Gorkha Airlines (2)
 Inter Island Airways (1)
 Island Aviation (3)
 Jagson Airlines (2)
 Lufttransport (2)
 National Cartographic Center of Iran (3)
 New Central Airlines (4)
 Sevenair (4)
 Simrick Airlines (2) owned by Agni Air
 Sita Air (3)
 Summit Air (5)
 Vision Airlines (1)
 MAYAir (2)

Dornier 228-200NG:
 Aurigny (2)
 Lufttransport (1)
 New Central Airlines (1)
 Susi Air (3) On order

Police, law enforcement, paramilitary operations

 Finnish Border Guard

 Indian Coast Guard – 38 Dornier 228-101 maritime surveillance aircraft

 National Cartographic Center of Iran – 2 Dornier Do-228-212 used for aerial survey

 Netherlands Coastguard (2)

 Royal Oman Police Air Wing

 Mauritius Coast Guard - 3 Dornier Do-228-212 in service. 

 Marine Fisheries Agency
 Ministry of Defence (Wet Lease from Summit Air)

Military operators

 National Air Force of Angola

 Bangladesh Navy – 4 Dornier 228NG MPA. 

 German Navy – 2 Dornier 228NG (MPA, Recce)

 Indian Air Force – operates 53 Dornier 228-201.
 Indian Navy – operates 26 Dornier 228-201 and have 12 on order.
Indian Coast Guard - operates 36 Dornier 228-201.
 DRDO – 1 Dornier 228 “Nabhratna” used as a flying test bed by LRDE

 Italian Army Aviation

 Military of Malawi – 3

 Niger Air Force – one delivered in 1986

 Nigerian Air Force – 1

 Seychelles Air Force – 2, gifted by India

 Sri Lanka Air Force – 1, +1 on order from HAL

 Royal Thai Navy – 7 MPA

 Venezuelan Air Force – 3 + 7 orders

Former military operators

 Coast Guard of Cape Verde

 Royal Bhutan Army (Bhutan Army Air Wing)

 German Air Force

References

Dornier 228
Dornier aircraft